Jayanti Patnaik (7 April 1932 – 28 September 2022) was an Indian politician and social worker. She was the first Chairperson of the National Commission for Women. Her term of office was from 3 February 1992 to 30 January 1995.

Early life and education
She was born in 1932 in Aska, Ganjam district of Orissa. Her father is Niranjan Patnaik. She was educated at Harihar High School, Aska. She has studied Master of Arts (M.A.) in Social Work from Sailabala Women's College under Utkal University, Cuttack. She pursued advanced studies at Tata Institute of Social Sciences, Mumbai.

She married politician Janaki Ballabh Patnaik in 1953, who later remained Chief Minister of Odisha (1980–89), and the couple had one son and two daughters.

References

1932 births
2022 deaths
India MPs 1980–1984
India MPs 1984–1989
India MPs 1998–1999
Rajya Sabha members from Odisha
Women in Odisha politics
People from Ganjam district
Utkal University alumni
Indian National Congress politicians from Odisha
Lok Sabha members from Odisha
20th-century Indian women politicians
20th-century Indian politicians
People from Cuttack
Women members of the Lok Sabha
Women members of the Rajya Sabha